Eishia Loretta Hudson (June 2, 2003 – April 8, 2020) was an Indigenous Canadian teenage girl who was shot by the Winnipeg Police Service following a robbery, car chase and collision. She later died due to the wound. After her death, there was public outrage and rallies against police brutality towards indigenous peoples.

Biography
Eishia Loletta Hudson was born in Winnipeg, Manitoba on June 2, 2003, to parents Christie Zebrasky and William Hudson. She was raised by her paternal grandmother in Berens River, Manitoba, until moving to Winnipeg at the age of eight to live with her mother.

Background
On April 8, 2020,  Winnipeg Police were called to a liquor store after it was reported that multiple suspects allegedly stole alcohol from the store, and took off in a stolen vehicle. An officer recognized the stolen vehicle and began following it down Lagimodiere Boulevard. The vehicle which was an SUV then rammed into a police cruiser and a car chase ensued. While in pursuit, the stolen vehicle collided with multiple other vehicles. Hudson was driving the vehicle with four other suspects inside. After the vehicle Hudson was driving crashed, police attempted to arrest them, she then tried to reverse the vehicle and at that point she was shot. Hudson was transported to hospital in critical condition and later died. The four other occupants in the vehicle were charged with robbery and other offences.

Aftermath
In response to Hudson's death, the Indigenous Bar Association pushed the Manitoba government for an independent inquiry into her death. On June 19, 2020, more than a thousand people gathered at the Manitoba Legislative Building for a rally to honour Hudson. Wab Kinew and Leah Gazan attended the rally.

On January 28, 2021, the  Independent Investigation Unit of Manitoba revealed that the unnamed officer who fatally shot Hudson would not be facing any charges.  Later that day at a press conference, Hudson’s father called for a public inquiry into police related deaths of  Indigenous peoples.

In December 2021, Hudson’s family filed a wrongful death lawsuit against the city of Winnipeg.

See also
List of killings by law enforcement officers in Canada

References 

Deaths by firearm in Manitoba
Killings by law enforcement officers in Canada
2003 births
Canadian people of Indigenous peoples descent
2020 deaths